Lasius coloradensis is a species of ant belonging to the genus Lasius, formerly a part of the genus (now a subgenus) Acanthomyops. Described in 1917 by Wheeler, the species is native to the United States. The queens of will make a claustral chamber and hibernate, laying eggs in the spring.

References

coloradensis
Hymenoptera of North America
Insects of the United States
Insects described in 1917